Racism in German history is inextricably linked to the Herero and Namaqua genocide in colonial times. Racism reached its peak during the Nazi regime which eventually led to a program of systematic state-sponsored murder known as The Holocaust. According to reports by the European Commission, milder forms of racism are still present in parts of German society.

19th and early 20th centuries
 
When Germany struggled to become a belated colonial power in the 19th century, several atrocities were committed, most notably the Herero and Namaqua Genocide in what is now Namibia. The German authorities forced the survivors of the genocide into concentration camps.

Eugen Fischer, a German professor of medicine, anthropology and eugenics conducted "medical experiments on race” in these camps, including sterilizations and injections of smallpox, typhus and tuberculosis. He advocated the genocide of alleged "inferior races" stating that "whoever thinks thoroughly about the notion of race, cannot arrive at a different conclusion".

The Herero genocide has commanded the attention of historians who study complex issues of continuity between this event and the Nazi Holocaust. According to Clarence Lusane, an Associate Professor of Political Science at the American University School of International Service, Fischer's experiments can be seen as testing ground for later medical procedures used during the Nazi Holocaust.

Against the Polish population
The Germanization policies against the Polish population in Germany were largely concentrated in territories conquered from Poland during the Partitions of Poland, but they were also enforced in Silesia, Pomerania and Masuria. They were motivated by racism.

The Third Reich
 
After the Nazis came to power in 1933, racism became a part of the official state ideology.

Shortly after the Nazis came to power, they passed the Law for the Restoration of the Professional Civil Service which expelled all civil servants who were of "non-Aryan" origin, with a few exceptions.

The Nazis passed the Nuremberg Laws in 1935. The first law known as the "Law for the Protection of German Blood and German Honour" forbade sexual relations and marriages between people of "German blood" and Jews. Shortly afterwards, the Nazis extended this law to include "Gypsies, negroes or their bastards".

Although the Nazis preached racial supremacy, in several books and pamphlets they stated that they were preaching racial consciousness rather than supremacy such as: 

The Nazis believed that race determined everything and they told the Germans to be racially conscious.

In the 1930s and 1940s, Nazi Germany's military conquest of Europe in the Second World War was followed by countless acts of racially motivated murder and genocide.

In its broad definition, the term Holocaust refers to an industrially run programme of state-sponsored murder by Nazi Germany, a genocide of different groups and the murder of individuals, whom the German authorities at this time defined as belonging to an "inferior race", as having "life unworthy of life" or advocating beliefs that were disturbing to their politics. The affected cultures use their own expressions such as: The Shoah (Hebrew: , HaShoah, "catastrophe"; Yiddish: , Churben or Hurban, in the Jewish context, the Porajmos [ˌpɔʁmɔs] (also Porrajmos or Pharrajimos, literally "devouring" or "destruction" in some dialects of the Romani language) used by Gypsies, or the Polish word "Zagłada" (literally meaning "annihilation", or "extinction") often used by Poles as a synonym of the word Holocaust.

The Holocaust was one of many outbreaks of antisemitism, a term coined in the late 19th century in Germany as a more scientific-sounding term for Judenhass ("Jew-hatred"). Scientific theories on antisemitism are divided into what degree it can be subsumed under racism and to what degree it can be subsumed under other causes and mechanisms.

Incidents in reunified Germany
More than 130 people were killed in racist street violence in Germany, in the years between 1990 and 2010, according to the German newspaper Die Zeit. Only some of the most publicly noted cases are listed below. In particular, after German reunification in the 1990s a wave of racist street violence claimed numerous lives, with notable incidents including the arson attack in Mölln and the Riot of Rostock-Lichtenhagen in 1992, the Solingen arson attack of 1993, and the attack on Noël Martin in 1996.

In 2006, a black German citizen of Ethiopian descent named as Ermyas M., an engineer was  beaten into a coma by two unknown assailants who called him "nigger" in an unprovoked attack that has reawakened concern about racist violence in eastern Germany. He was waiting for a tram in Potsdam, near Berlin, when two people approached him shouting "nigger". When he objected, they attacked him with a bottle and beat him to the ground.

Also in 2006, German-Turkish politician Giyasettin Sayan, a member of Berlin's regional assembly, was attacked by two men who called him a "dirty foreigner". Sayan, who represents the Left party, suffered head injuries and bruising after his attackers struck him with a bottle in a street in his Lichtenberg ward in the East of the city.

In August 2007, a mob consisting of about 50 Germans attacked 8 Indian street vendors during a town festival in the town of Muegeln near Leipzig. The victims found shelter in a pizzeria owned by Kulvir Singh, one of those being chased, but the mob broke through the doors and destroyed Singh's car. All eight were injured and it took 70 police to quell the violence

There is evidence that, in 2015, Professor Annette Beck-Sickinger at the University of Leipzig in Germany rejected Indian candidates on the basis of racism and stereotyping. The incidents were so severe - amid shock that they were perpetrated by an apparently 'educated' woman - that Germany's ambassador to India wrote a strongly worded letter condemning the professor, stating: "Your oversimplifying and discriminating generalization is an offense ... to millions of law-abiding, tolerant, open-minded and hard-working Indians," he wrote. "Let's be clear: India is not a country of rapists."

General reports
The European Commission against Racism and Intolerance (ECRI) noted in 2001, in its second report on the situation of the approximately 9% non- citizen population after German reunification:

Civil rights activist Ika Hügel-Marshall has complained that she and others found it difficult to be regarded as German due to their ethnic background. She co-founded the Afro-Deutsch movement in the 1980s to raise awareness of Germans with African ancestry. The movement was designed "to resist marginalization and discrimination, to gain social acceptance, and to construct a cultural identity for themselves."

According to the United Nations, people with a migrant background also "are under-represented in important institutions, including the political system, the police and the courts".

Public debate
Critics say that a lingering xenophobia  in parts of German society is being ignored. A representative from the country's Jewish Council argued that Germany is lacking a coordinated "nationwide action plan" when it comes to right-wing extremism.

A former government spokesman Uwe-Karsten Heye said that dark-skinned visitors to Germany should consider avoiding the eastern part of the country where racism runs high. "There are small and medium-sized towns in Brandenburg, as well as elsewhere, which I would advise a visitor of another skin color to avoid going to. It is also reported that German police 'routinely ignore racist attacks'. Former SPD politician Sebastian Edathy said "People with dark skin have a much higher risk of being a victim of an attack in eastern Germany than in western Germany." He also accused municipalities in the east of not investing enough in the prevention of right-wing extremism."

Undercover journalist Günter Wallraff traveled across Germany for more than a year wearing a dark-haired curly wig and his white skin painted black, in a documentary film titled Black on White. He said that "I hadn't known what we would discover, and had thought maybe the story will be, what a tolerant and accepting country we have become, unfortunately I was wrong."

According to a 2019 report presented by the German Federal Anti-Discrimination Agency, the number of cases of racial discrimination reported in Germany rose by almost 10% to 1,176 since 2015.

Germany has an "ongoing problem with racial discrimination and does not give enough consistent legal support to victims," says Bernhard Franke, the acting head of the German anti-discrimination agency. According to him, the feeling of being left alone with injustice has "dire consequences in the long run that endanger social cohesion."

Racist organizations in Germany
 
Despite widespread rejection of Nazi Germany in modern Germany, there have been Neo-Nazi activities and organizations in post-war Germany. At times these groups face legal issues. Hence the Volkssozialistische Bewegung Deutschlands/Partei der Arbeit, Action Front of National Socialists/National Activists, Free German Workers' Party, and the Nationalist Front were all banned. The National Democratic Party of Germany has been accused of Neo-Nazi or Neo-Fascist leanings
 but historian Walter Laqueur writes that it cannot be classified that way.

References

External links

Official reports
Report of the UN Special Rapporteur on Contemporary forms of racism, racial discrimination, xenophobia and related intolerance on his visit to Germany, 2010
European Commission against Racism and Intolerance — 4thj report on Germany
CERD concluding observations on Germany, 2008
Racism in Germany and its impact on the Turkish minority
Germany: freedom to speak on racism under threat
"Germany's 'Brown Babies' Must Be Helped! Will You?": U.S. Adoption Plans for Afro-German Children, 1950-1955

News items
German racist attacks soar
Germany Needs to Do More Against Racism, UN Body Says 
How racist is Germany?
Racism in Germany: Double-Talk by Political Parties
Study: Racism in Germany Increasingly Mainstream 
"A deep-rooted racism in Germany" - International press review after the racist attack in Muegeln

 
Human rights abuses in Germany
Germany